Perseu Abramo (July 17, 1929 in São Paulo – March 6, 1996) was a Brazilian journalist and writer. Apart from working in many Brazilian vehicles, he also had an intense political life and taught in many higher education institutions. He is one of the creators of Vladimir Herzog Award. He was Cláudio Abramo's nephew.

Biography 
He graduated from social sciences at Faculty of Philosophy, Letters and Human Sciences of the University of São Paulo at 1959. In 1968, he mastered at human sciences at the Federal University of Bahia, in Salvador, Bahia.

Throughout his career, he worked in various vehicles, including Jornal de São Paulo, Folha Socialista (from the Brazilian Socialist Party), A Hora, O Estado de S. Paulo (where, in 1960, he obtained the Esso Journalism Award for coordinating the team of journalists who covered the inauguration of Brasília), Folha de S. Paulo, Rádio Eldorado (which he helped to build), TV Globo, Jornal dos Trabalhadores (and other publications from the Worker's Party) and many others.

As a professor, he taught at places such as Faculdade Cásper Líbero, Federal University of Bahia, Fundação Escola de Sociologia e Política de São Paulo, Fundação Armando Alvares Penteado and Pontifícia Universidade Católica de São Paulo, where he worked until his death in 1996. He also contributed to the creation of the University of Brasília.

Perseu was also a member of the Brazilian Socialist Party and later the Workers' Party.

Bibliography 
 Um trabalhador da notícia: textos de Perseu Abramo (1997) (organized by his daughter Bia Abramo)
Padrões de Manipulação na grande imprensa (with introduction by José Arbex Jr., preface by Hamilton Octavio de Souza and posface by Aloysio Biondi)

References

External links 
 Fundação Perseu Abramo, a foundation named after him and linked to the Workers' Party.

1929 births
1996 deaths
Brazilian journalists
Brazilian people of Italian-Jewish descent
Workers' Party (Brazil) politicians
Brazilian Socialist Party politicians
University of São Paulo alumni
Jewish Brazilian politicians
Jewish Brazilian writers
Jewish socialists
Writers from São Paulo
20th-century journalists